Wyoming Highway 37 (WYO 37) is a  north–south Wyoming state highway located in northern Big Horn County and travels from U.S. Route 14A north into Bighorn Canyon National Recreation Area.

Route description
Wyoming Highway 37 begins at its southern end at U.S. Route 14A, east of Lovell, and travels north into Bighorn Canyon National Recreation Area.
State maintenance of WYO 37 ends at 9 miles, but the roadway itself continues north through the National Recreation area, and to Pryor Mountains Wild Horse Range. Into Montana, the road continues north further into the recreation area and to an area called Barry's Landing.

Major intersections

References

Official 2003 State Highway Map of Wyoming

External links 

Wyoming State Routes 000-099
WYO 37 - US 14A to Big Horn National Recreation Area

Transportation in Big Horn County, Wyoming
037